Citrus Stadium is a 10,000-capacity multi-use stadium located in Glendora, California.

The stadium, which features a running track, serves as home to American football, athletics, and soccer for Citrus College and the USL Premier Development League side FC Golden State Force.

It is also the home stadium for several area High Schools, including Gladstone HS (Covina), Azusa HS (Azusa), and Glendora HS (Glendora).

External links
 L.A. Sports Council - Citrus Stadium
 

College football venues
Soccer venues in California
Citrus College
Athletics (track and field) venues in California
American football venues in California
High school football venues in California
Glendora, California